"Just Say Stet" is the debut single by American Hip hop group Stetsasonic, released in 1985 via Tommy Boy Records. It was included on their debut album On Fire, released the following year. All members of the group have credits as composers of the song, which they produced in collaboration with Eric Calvi and Robin Halpin as per the liner notes credits.

The song has a production based on electro music. Also in it DBC is credited with playing keyboards and horn, being one of the most remarkable peculiarities of the group that its members play instruments.

In 1999, Ego Trips editors ranked "Just Say Stet" at  10 in their list of Hip Hop's 40 Greatest Singles by Year 1985 in Ego Trip's Book of Rap Lists.

Conception and composition 
Prince Paul told Complex in 2011, that he was still attending high school at the time of producing the song: 
Though it's labeled "Instrumental", A2 is in fact more like a slightly extended dub version of A1. It ends in a locked groove with the word "Stet" at the end of the final "Just say Stet!" repeating over and over to infinity (The scratched message in the runout groove on Side A references this).
Some copies came with a free STET sticker.

Personnel
Credits are taken from the liner notes and the official page of the ASCAP.
Written By – Glenn Bolton, Arnold Hamilton, Paul Huston, Martin Nemley, Leonardo Roman, Marvin Shahid Wright
Producer – Stetsasonic
Co-producer – Eric Calvi, Robin Halpin (tracks: A1, A2), Jim Klein (track B)
Keyboards, Horns – DBC
Mastered By – Herbie Jr :^)* (Herb Powers Jr.)
Engineer – Eric Calvi
Producer (exec.) – Tom Silverman

Single track listing

12" Vinyl

A-Side
 "Just Say Stet" (3:40)
 "Just Say Stet" (Instrumental) (3:44)

B-Side
 "Rock De La Stet" (Vocal) (6:30)

References

1985 songs